Fluke Ridge is a narrow rock ridge rising to about  in southern Aristotle Mountains, on the north side of Flask Glacier near the terminus, on Oscar II Coast, Graham Land, Antarctica. It was named by the UK Antarctic Place-Names Committee in 1987; it is one of several names in the area from Herman Melville's Moby-Dick which reflect a whaling theme.

References 

Ridges of Graham Land
Oscar II Coast